Marcel Crête was Chief Justice of Quebec from 1980 to 1988.

References 

1915 births
1988 deaths
Judges in Quebec
Lawyers in Quebec
People from La Tuque, Quebec
Université Laval Faculté de droit alumni
20th-century Canadian judges